Goluzino is a rural locality (a village) in Korobitsynskoye Rural Settlement, Syamzhensky District, Vologda Oblast, Russia. The population was 75 as of 2002.

Geography 
Goluzino is located 53 km southeast of Syamzha (the district's administrative centre) by road. Klimushino is the nearest rural locality.

References 

Rural localities in Syamzhensky District